Danos is a surname. Notable people with the surname include:

Perry Danos, American musician
Pierre Danos (born 1929), French rugby union player
Tom Danos, Australian barrister